The U.S. Navy and U.S. Marine Corps have a well-defined set of principles that govern the designations given to their aircraft squadrons. This designation system was introduced in 1922 and, although there have been changes and additions to it over time, the system as a whole is still in use to present day.

Basic Principles
The U.S. Navy and U.S. Marine Corps squadron designation comprises a combination of letters and numerals, each having a precise meaning. From left to right, the designation includes the following three components:
 First letter signifies the type of equipment used by the squadron, where
 V stands for fixed-wing aircraft (originally – heavier-than-air)
 Z is for lighter-than-Air craft, and
 H is for rotorcraft (helicopters)
 Subsequent letters (one or several), known as "class letters", indicate the primary mission of the squadron.
 Finally, a numeral, preceded by a dash, is the unique number of the squadron within its class.

Thus, for example, VP-1 is the designator for Patrol Squadron One, where the "V" stands for Heavier-than-Air and the class letter "P" stands for Patrol, while ZP-1 is the designator for Airship Patrol Squadron One, with the "Z" indicating Lighter-than-Air.

Two or more class letters may follow the "V". In such designators the following letters usually narrow down the class specified by the preceding one: for example, VAH-1 stands for Heavy Attack Squadron One.
There are exceptions to this rule, however. In a designation like VAW-123, the "AW" is to be treated as an unbreakable combination that signifies Airborne Early Warning and has nothing to do with "A" for Attack.

What follows is a list of designations that have been used or are in use by actual squadrons of the U.S. Navy and U.S. Marine Corps.

U.S. Navy - List of Fixed Wing Squadron Designations

Between 1927 and 1937 suffix letters (or assignment letters) were in use to indicate Fleet or Force assignments of a particular squadron.

Thus, for example, VF-1B stood for Fighter Squadron One, attached to Battle Fleet.

The full list of pre-war suffix letters is as follows:

A brief resurgence of suffix letters in the Navy squadron designators was seen between 1946 and 1948.

The following suffix letters were in use during that period:

In 1948 the use of suffix letters in squadron designators was discontinued.

U.S. Navy - List of Lighter-than-Air Squadron Designations
The following designations for Lighter-than-Air squadron were in use:

U.S. Navy - List of Rotary Wing Squadron Designations

U.S. Marine Corps - List of Fixed Wing Squadron Designations
Squadron designations between 1920 and 1937:

During that period of time a squadron of the Marine Corps could be distinguished from a Navy squadron by a suffix letter "M".

Thus, VF-2M stood for Marine Fighter Squadron Two, VO-8M stood for Marine Observation Squadron Eight, and so forth.

In 1937 the suffix letters in squadron designators were discontinued, and the letter "M" signifying the Marine Corps was moved into a fixed place after the "V". Designations of all existing Marine squadrons were changed accordingly: e.g., VF-2M became VMF-2.

Squadron designations after 1937:

U.S. Marine Corps - List of Rotary Wing and Tiltrotor Squadron Designations

References

Notes

Bibliography

 Thomas E. Doll, Berkley R. Jackson, William A. Riley. Navy Air Colors, United States Navy, Marine Corps and Coast Guard Aircraft Camouflage and Markings Vol.1. Carrollton, Texas: Squadron/Signal Publications, 1983. .
 Thomas E. Doll, Berkley R. Jackson, William A. Riley. Navy Air Colors, United States Navy, Marine Corps and Coast Guard Aircraft Camouflage and Markings Vol.2. Carrollton, Texas: Squadron/Signal Publications, 1985. .
 Roy A. Grossnick. Dictionary of American Naval Aviation Squadrons, Volume 1. Washington, D.C: Naval Historical Center, 1995. .
 Michael D. Roberts. Dictionary of American Naval Aviation Squadrons, Volume 2. Washington, D.C: Naval Historical Center, 2000.
 Roy A. Grossnick. Kite Balloons to Airships... the Navy's Lighter-than-Air Experience. Washington, D.C: Naval Air Systems Command, 1986.

United States Marine Corps aviation
United States naval aviation